Combs is an unincorporated community and coal town within Perry County, Kentucky, United States. It was named for Abijah Benjamin Combs. At one time, the town was called Lennut; its post office, no longer existent, used this name.

Demographics

References

Unincorporated communities in Perry County, Kentucky
Coal towns in Kentucky
Unincorporated communities in Kentucky